Flesh and Fury is a 1952 American film noir drama sport film directed by Joseph Pevney and starring Tony Curtis, Jan Sterling and Mona Freeman.

Plot
Boxing fan Sonya Bartow and manager Pop Richardson are both impressed the first time they see amateur Paul Callan win a fight. They are more amazed, and Sonya somewhat appalled, when they discover later that Paul is deaf.

Pop agrees to train him, even though he's still not quite over the death in the ring of a former protege. A romantic relationship begins with Sonya, but she refuses to marry Paul until he's a champion. She impatiently pushes Pop to set up a title fight, even if he is not ready yet.

When a reporter, Ann Hollis, comes to interview Paul, she uses sign language. Sonya mocks it as a "dummy" language and Paul explains that he has always been reluctant to use it. Ann begins seeing Paul socially, takes him to a deaf-children's school and introduces him to her deaf father, a successful architect. Sonya drunkenly threatens to kill Ann if she does not leave Paul alone.

A doctor performs an operation that restores Paul's hearing. He rushes to Ann's house, but a party there is so noisy that it confuses and overwhelms him. Paul goes back to Sonya and is excitedly told that a fight's been arranged with Logan, the champ. Paul discovers that Sonya has hidden a telegram from the doctor, explaining that a beating in the ring could cause him to again go deaf.

Sonya bets heavily on the fight, but on Paul to lose. The punches he absorbs cause his hearing to fade. With all the distracting noise tuned out, Paul rallies to win the fight. He reunites with Ann, and is relieved when he can hear her speak.

Cast
 Tony Curtis as Paul Callan
 Jan Sterling as Sonya Bartow
 Mona Freeman as Ann Hollis
 Wallace Ford as Jack 'Pop' Richardson
 Connie Gilchrist as Mrs. Richardson
 Katherine Locke as Mrs. Hollis
 Harry Shannon as Mike Callan, Paul's Father
 Louis Jean Heydt as Whity
 Tom Powers as Andy Randoph 
 Nella Walker as Mrs. Hackett
 Harry Guardino as Lou Callan - Paul's Brother
 Joe Gray as Cliff
 Harry Ravan as Murphy
 Ted Stanhope as Maris, the Bulter

See also
 List of American films of 1952
 List of films featuring the deaf and hard of hearing

References

External links
 
 
 

1952 films
1950s sports drama films
American black-and-white films
American boxing films
American sports drama films
Film noir
Films about deaf people
Films directed by Joseph Pevney
Films scored by Hans J. Salter
Universal Pictures films
1952 drama films
1950s English-language films
1950s American films
Films about disability